Tianyuan Cave is near Beijing, where Tianyuan man, one of the earliest modern humans, was found.

The remains in the Tianyuan Cave have ancestral relations "to many present-day Asians and Native Americans".

See also
 Niah Caves
 Fuyan Cave

References

External links
 Ancient human unearthed in China
 Tianyuan, mtDNA B and the formation of Far Eastern peoples

Caves of Beijing
Archaeological sites in China